Viviparus bermondianus is a species of a freshwater snail with gills and an operculum, an aquatic gastropod mollusk in the family Ampullariidae, the apple snails.

Distribution 
Viviparus bermondianus is endemic to the Zapata Peninsula, Cuba. It has not been currently found and has perhaps disappeared.

References 

Viviparidae
Gastropods described in 1842
Endemic fauna of Cuba